Zanthoxylum pinnatum, commonly known as yellow wood, is a species of flowering plant of the family Rutaceae native to Lord Howe and Norfolk Islands. It is a tree with pinnate leaves, white male and female flowers arranged in groups in leaf axils, and spherical, purple follicles containing a single black seed.

Description

Taxonomy
Yellow wood was first formally described in 1775 by Johann Reinhold Forster and Georg Forster who gave it the name Blackburnia pinnata in their book Characteres Generum Plantarum.<ref name="Forst.">{{cite book |last1=Forster |first1=Johann R. |last2=Forster |first2=Georg |title=Characteres Generum Plantarum |date=1775 |publisher=Prostant apud B. White, T. Cadell, & P. Elmsly,1776 |location=London |pages=11–12 |url=https://www.biodiversitylibrary.org/item/23365#page/28/mode/1up |access-date=19 August 2020}}</ref> In 1917, Walter Oliver changed the name to Zanthoxylum pinnatum in Transactions and Proceedings of the New Zealand Institute.

Distribution and habitatZanthoxylum pinnatum'' grows in forest on Lord Howe and Norfolk Islands but is not common on either island.

References

pinnatum
Plants described in 1775
Taxa named by Johann Reinhold Forster
Taxa named by Georg Forster
Flora of Lord Howe Island
Flora of Norfolk Island